Richard Hartley may refer to:
 Richard Gordon Hartley (1939–2016), Australian civil engineer and historian
 Richard I. Hartley, Australian computer scientist
 Richard Neville Hartley (born 1944), English composer
 Dick Hartley, college football player